The 2013 FIA WTCC Race of Slovakia was the third round of the 2013 World Touring Car Championship season and the second running of the FIA WTCC Race of Slovakia. It was held on 28 April 2013 at the Automotodróm Slovakia Ring in Orechová Potôň, Slovakia.

The first race was won by Gabriele Tarquini who took the first win for the Castrol Honda World Touring Car Team and the Honda Civic WTCC. Tom Coronel won race two for ROAL Motorsport.

Background
Yvan Muller was leading the world drivers' championship while James Nash was leading the Yokohama Independents' Trophy.

The compensation weight system came into force after the first two rounds, the Chevrolet Cruze 1.6Ts continued with the 40 kg maximum ballast to maintain their weight of 1,190 kg. The BMW 320 TCs and Lada Grantas lost 20 kg to drop to 1,130 kg while the Honda Civic WTCCs and SEAT León WTCCs remained at their base weights of 1,150 kg. The BMWs were allowed to run with three carbon fibre doors to reduce their weight with the original drivers' door remaining the same.

Fernando Monje came into the round with a five–place grid penalty for the first race after his collision with James Thompson at the Race of Morocco.

Report

Free practice
Tarquini led a Honda 1–2 in the first free practice session with Tiago Monteiro second. Coronel was the fastest BMW driver in third ahead of the RML pair of Muller and Tom Chilton. Fredy Barth ended his session early when he got his Wiechers-Sport BMW stuck in the gravel at turn three while an exhaust fire hindered Zengő Motorsport's Norbert Michelisz.

Tarquini was quickest once again the second practice session, leading Muller and Chilton. Robert Huff was the quickest SEAT driver in fourth and Michelisz was seventh after his problems in the morning session.

Qualifying
Having led both practice sessions, Tarquini took his second consecutive pole position of the season, leading a Honda 1–2–3 with Monteiro and Michelisz behind. Tom Boardman stopped just after leaving the pit lane for the first time when his engine misfired, he had already had a new engine fitted after his crash in Marrakech and then required another new engine after free practice two. Five minutes into the first part of qualifying, Darryl O'Young ran wide, crashed his ROAL Motorsport BMW into the barriers at turn nine and brought out the red flags. The session resumed half an hour later once the barriers had been repaired and after Huff topped the times before the stoppage, Tarquini went to the top of the times by the end of Q1. Thompson, Fernando Monje and Marc Basseng failed to get through to the second session for the first time in 2013.

Tarquini was quickest in Q2 with team–mate Monteiro ensuring a Castrol Honda World Touring Car Team front row lockout. Michelisz in third shared the second row with championship leader Muller. Coronel ended up tenth to secure the race two pole position on the reversed grid.

Huff failed the ride height check after qualifying and received a ten–place grid penalty for race one as a result.

Warm-Up
Michelisz was fastest in Sunday morning's warm–up session, the yellow flags were out briefly when Chilton crashed his RML Chevrolet at turn two.

Race One
Tarquini started on pole position and built up an early lead with Monteiro and Michelisz behind being pursued by Muller. Chilton made contact with Fredy Barth and then went off at turn six on the second lap and got stuck in the gravel trap. Nash held off Coronel for the first eight laps until the bamboo-engineering ran wide at turn eight and allowed Coronel through. Towards the end of the race Michelisz attempted to take second place off Monteiro but did not succeed and the two factory Hondas finished first and second. Four cars were fighting for the final points position with Mehdi Bennani securing tenth spot and Barth beating Stefano D'Aste to eleventh by five thousandths of a second at the line.

Race Two
Coronel started at the front of the grid and got away from the rest of the field at the start, Pepe Oriola retained his second place and Huff was third. Michel Nykjær didn't get away at the start but the rest of the field avoided him, Nash went out of the race on the opening lap when he ran into one of the gravel traps. On lap two Muller tapped Monteiro out of fourth place and went through. At half distance Huff was able to pass Oriola and Muller also went through into the podium position with Tarquini going down the other side of the SEAT. Muller, Oriola and Tarquini ran three abreast into the next corner where Oriola and Tarquini touched with Oriola dropping down to sixth. Huff and Muller resumed their battle for position until Huff ran wide at turn one allowing both Muller and Tarquini through, Huff was now fourth ahead of Monteiro. Oriola was sixth and battling with Chilton, Michelisz was also involved until he dropped to the back of the field in the final laps. Coronel claimed the win, his first since the 2011 Race of Japan, Muller was second with race one winner Tarquini third.

Results

Qualifying

Bold denotes Pole position for second race.

Race 1

Bold denotes Fastest lap.

Race 2

Bold denotes Fastest lap.

Standings after the event

Drivers' Championship standings

Yokohama Independents' Trophy standings

Manufacturers' Championship standings

 Note: Only the top five positions are included for both sets of drivers' standings.

References

External links
World Touring Car Championship official website

Slovakia
Race of Slovakia
FIA WTCC Race of Slovakia